Operation Thunderbolt is a light gun shooter video game developed by Taito and released for arcades in 1988. As the sequel to Operation Wolf, changes include two-player gameplay with two positional gun controllers mounted on the arcade cabinet, and a new forward-scrolling pseudo-3D perspective combined with side-scrolling sections.

The arcade game was a commercial success and was one of the top three highest-grossing dedicated arcade games of 1989 in both Japan and the United States. Versions were released for Amiga, Commodore 64, and Super Nintendo Entertainment System. The arcade exclusive sequel Operation Wolf 3 was released in 1994.

Gameplay
Green berets Roy Adams and Hardy Jones must save American hostages from a hijacked airliner which was forced to land in the fictional African province, Kalubya. They must capture six different bases, shoot enemies with machine guns or grenade launcher, and try to save the hostages. Enemies include soldiers, jeeps, tanks, and helicopters, attacking with bullets, grenades, or rockets. In stages 4 and 6, killing one of the hostages will decrease the player's life.  At least one hostage must be rescued in those stages or the game is over. In Stage 8, the players must engage with the lead hijacker holding the pilot hostage and continues are not permitted. If the pilot gets killed, a bad ending will be shown "The pilot is dead; escape is impossible". If the hijacker is killed, the good ending will be shown where the player and hostages flee the hostile nation with the plane's takeoff.

Changes from Operation Wolf include the arcade cabinet using positional gun controllers instead of light gun, two-player simultaneous play with two mounted guns, and a new forward-scrolling pseudo-3D perspective combined with side-scrolling sections.

Ports

Ocean Software published conversions of Operation Thunderbolt for the Amiga, Amstrad CPC 464, Atari ST, Commodore 64, and ZX Spectrum in 1989. A cartridge version for the Amstrad GX4000 followed in 1993.

The Super NES version was released by Taito in 1994 and works with the SNES Mouse and the Super Scope. The player can choose from a variety of different characters. The storyline was altered so that the hijackers were members of the fictional Bintazi People's Republic, under lifelong dictator General Abul Bazarre, who demands that his comrades be freed or the hostages will be executed.

Reception

In Japan, Game Machine listed Operation Thunderbolt in its February 1, 1989 issue as the second most successful upright arcade unit of the month. It became Japan's second highest-grossing dedicated arcade game of 1989, below Chase H.Q. In the United States, Operation Thunderbolt was the third highest grossing dedicated arcade game of 1989. Operation Thunderbolt was also Japan's eighth highest-grossing dedicated arcade game of 1990.

Reviews
The arcade game received positive reviews from critics, upon release. Commodore User said it "takes all the best elements" of Operation Wolf, including "the brilliant graphics" and "action blasting", and added "a two-player option, a brand new perspective and some really clever scenario ideas".

Reviewing the Super NES version, GamePro praised the colorful and detailed graphics and strong sound effects, but criticized the repetitiveness of the gameplay and the slowness of the aiming reticule, and concluded that "this Operation is a success, generating plenty of shootin' thrills for intermediate soldiers". A reviewer for Next Generation dismissed it as "another shooting-gallery game, just like Operation Wolf ... It's good for a mild adrenaline rush–barely–but that's it".

Accolades
The game won the 1989 award for best graphics of the year according to the readers of Crash magazine.

At a British game industry awards event held at the end of 1989, Operation Thunderbolt was awarded "Best 16-bit arcade license translation" for Ocean Software's home computer conversions.

Legacy
Operation Thunderbolt is in the Taito Legends compilation for Microsoft Windows, PlayStation 2, and Xbox.

See also
Operation Wolf (1987)
Line of Fire (1989)
Space Gun (1990)
Operation Gunbuster (1992)

References

External links

1988 video games
Amiga games
Amstrad CPC games
Arcade video games
Atari ST games
Commodore 64 games
Light gun games
Ocean Software games
Rail shooters
Super Nintendo Entertainment System games
Video games about terrorism
Video games scored by Hisayoshi Ogura
ZX Spectrum games
Video game sequels
Taito arcade games
Video games developed in Japan